Zdworskie Lake is a lake Masovian Voivodeship, Poland. It is undergoing ecological restoration due to eutrophication (excessive plant growth).

References

Lakes of Poland
Lakes of Masovian Voivodeship